Euroclassic Notturno is a six-hour radio sequence of classical music recordings assembled by BBC Radio from material supplied by members of the European Broadcasting Union (EBU) and distributed, via the EBU's Euroradio satellite network, to a number of these broadcasters for use in their overnight classical music schedules. The recordings used are not taken from commercially available CDs but come instead from earlier (usually live) radio broadcasts.

Though supplied by the BBC on a commercial basis, the service nevertheless claims to provide broadcasters with a less expensive alternative to local origination of overnight classical-music programming.

Format
The sequence is put together by a small BBC team in London and Salford, and gaps are provided in the schedule to allow for local origination of explanatory material in each broadcaster's national language (written programme notes in English are supplied by the BBC some weeks in advance), top-of-the-hour news summaries, etc. In the United Kingdom, however, the sequence is broadcast on BBC Radio 3 without news.

Broadcast
The service is streamed from Broadcasting House in London between 0.00 and 6.00 Central European Time seven days a week, though actual transmission times may be shifted locally – the BBC itself, for instance, broadcasts its own version (which goes out under the title Through the Night) between 0.30 and 6.30 on Mondays to Fridays, and from 1.00 till 7.00 on Saturdays and Sundays. BBC Radio 3's Through the Night was first broadcast on 5 May 1996 when 24-hour broadcasting was introduced on the station. The first presenter was Donald Macleod.
 
As transmission is unattended the playout servers are duplicated to provide resilience, although the service has, in fact, run reliably since 1998.

Broadcasters
EBU member broadcasting organisations currently taking the service include (all indicated times are local):

EBU members that previously carried the service include:

 – ČRo Vltava (ČRo)
 – DR P2
 – Rás 1 (RÚV)
 – RTÉ lyric fm (1998 – early 2000s)
 − Rai Radio Classica (2014–17)
 – NPO Radio 4
 – NRK P2

References

External links

1996 radio programme debuts
1998 radio programme debuts
BBC Radio 3 programmes
British classical music radio programmes
Classical music radio programs
Eurovision events
Hungarian radio programs
Italian radio programs
Polish radio programs
Slovenian radio programs
Sveriges Radio programmes